Luis Alberto Gutiérrez Herrera (born January 15, 1985 in Santa Cruz de la Sierra) is a Bolivian football defender. He currently plays for Bolivar.

Club career
Gutiérrez began playing professionally for Oriente Petrolero in 2004. He spent time on loan at Israeli side Ironi Kiryat Shmona in 2009–10 and Brazilian team Bahia in 2012.

International career
Gutiérrez made his debut for the Bolivia national team in 2007 as made appearances as member of the squad during the 2011 Copa América.

Honours

Club
Hapoel Kiryat Shmona
Israel Super Cup: 2015

External links
 
 

1985 births
Living people
Bolivian footballers
Bolivia international footballers
Bolivian expatriate footballers
Oriente Petrolero players
Hapoel Ironi Kiryat Shmona F.C. players
Esporte Clube Bahia players
Club Atlético Patronato footballers
Liga Leumit players
Israeli Premier League players
Expatriate footballers in Argentina
Expatriate footballers in Brazil
Expatriate footballers in Israel
Sportspeople from Santa Cruz de la Sierra
2011 Copa América players
Association football fullbacks